Eustis is a city in Lake County, Florida, United States. The population was 23,189 at the 2020 census. It is part of the Orlando–Kissimmee–Sanford Metropolitan Statistical Area. Eustis High School is the town's local public high school.

The City of Eustis holds a festival every year which begins on the last Friday of February and runs through Sunday and has been held since 1902. This festival, referred to simply as GeorgeFest, is recognized today as the longest ongoing annual event held in honor of George Washington, first President of the United States.

Geography

The city limits are defined by Eudora, Abrams, and CR 44 (bypass) on the east, CR44 to the north, US Hwy 441 to the south and Lake Eustis and Florida Hospital Waterman to the west.

Demographics

As of the 2020 census, Eustis City had a population of 23,189 and 8,106 households. 

Of that population, 6.0% were under 5 years old, 20.7% were 18 years old, 21.0%. 51.9% of the population were female. 

68.1% of the population were white, 21.9% were black, 0.3% were American Indian and Alaska Native, 0.5% were Asian, 7.8% were two or more races, and 17.2% were Hispanic or Latino. 

There were 1,762 veterans living in the city and 12.2% were foreign born persons. There were 2.55 persons per household. 92.8% of the households had a computer and 87.1% of households had a broadband internet subscription. 

Of the population older than 25 years, 86.9% had a highschool degree or higher and 19.0% of that same population had a Bachelor’s degree or higher.

11.7% of the population 65 years and older lived with a disability and 19.1% of that same population did not have health insurance. 

The median household income was $52,074 and the per capita income was $26,974. 16.0% of the population lived below the poverty threshold. 

The population per square mile 2,123.7. 

Eustis also serves as the center for many small communities of Rural East Lake County including Cassia and Pine Lakes. These communities are not reflected in the Census Bureau's city statistics but make up for the vast discrepancy in county to city statistics. When the rural statistics are compiled into the city stats, the total population of Eustis topped 50,000 in 2000.

Education

Numerous educational institutions are zoned for Eustis: Eustis Heights Elementary, Eustis Elementary, Eustis Middle School, Eustis High School, and Alee Academy.

History

The people of Eustis, on the east shore of Lake Eustis, took their time deciding on a name. First it was Highlands, then Pendryville, and finally Lake Eustis, itself named about 1825 for General Abraham Eustis. General Eustis, prominent in the Seminole Wars, had skirmished with the Indians on the south shore, near present-day Tavares, Florida. In 1876, A.S. Pendry homesteaded and set out a citrus grove. In 1877 he opened the Ocklawaha Hotel. The post office in the lobby carried the sign "Pendryville". 

Before railroads came in the 1880s, Eustis was a busy port for steamers plying Lakes Harris, Eustis, Dora, and Griffin. In 1883 the "Lake" was dropped and the town became just Eustis. Although the U.S. opened up the area for homesteading in the 1850s, settlement was delayed by the Civil War. Surveying was finally completed in 1875 and settlement began in earnest. Among the earliest settlers was Guilford David "G.D." Clifford, who established a store and began the first mail service for the new settlement. It was in the Clifford General Store second floor meeting hall that the town's first churches were formed. Episcopal, Methodist, and Presbyterian groups all organized and held services there before they had their own buildings.

The first homes were those of D.W. Herrick, A.D. Herrick, and Henry Key. In 1881 Clifford and Smith built the first general store in the building later occupied by A.D. and C.D. Miller. A big year was 1878 when the town's first telegraph line connected Eustis, Leesburg, and Sanford. The railroad arrived in 1880, the first train coming from Astor to Fort Mason, where passengers and freight made lake steamer connections to Leesburg, Helena, Yalaha, Bloomfield, Lane Park, and Tavares. Bertie Clifford was the first baby born before Eustis was incorporated in 1883, and Edith Hutchins the first baby of the newly incorporated town. D.W. Herrick was the first mayor. G.D. Clifford's dream home in Eustis was designed in 1894 but the Big Freeze of 1894–1895 postponed its completion until 1911. Says Eustis historian Louise Carter, "Even though the freeze brought the town's economy to a standstill, Mr. Clifford kept his lakefront general store open and extended credit until people could recover."

According to an 1887 business directory, the Clifford Store on Lake Eustis sold groceries, hardware, building material, fertilizers, stoves, crockery, glassware, hay, and grain. The opera house, on the second floor, was a cultural center of Eustis and a wide swath of Central Florida. The eighteen-room house at the corner of Bay Street and Bates Avenue today houses the Eustis Historical Museum and Preservation Society, and takes visitors back to the gracious Lake County lifestyle of one hundred-odd years ago.

Dr. J. H. Potter, the founding pastor of the First Presbyterian Church, encouraged the development of Eustis Seminary in 1886, under the direction of Professor Byron F. Marsh (for whom Marsh Memorial Park is named). The seminary served students from first through twelfth grades. Its buildings were located near the present site of Eustis High School on Washington Avenue. Struggling financially, the school closed around 1895. By the early 1900s, Eustis was already a winter vacation spot for many. The Ocklawaha Hotel catered to the wealthy. Eustis continues to be a popular winter destination.

National historic status

There are several locations in Eustis which have been included in the National Register of Historic Places.
They are:
 Clifford House
 Eustis Commercial Historic District
 Ferran Park and the Alice McClelland Memorial Bandshell
 Gould Hyde Norton House
 Moses J. Taylor House
 Purdy Villa
 William Kimbrough Pendleton House
 Woman's Club of Eustis

Notable people

 Edgar James Banks, diplomat, antiquarian and novelist
 Tzimon Barto, classical pianist
 Rod Brewer, baseball player
 Joe Burnett, NFL professional football player (New York Giants, Pittsburgh Steelers)
 Jeff Coffey, musician, joined rock group "Chicago" in October 2016
 Rod Ferrell, convicted murderer
 Anthony Fieldings, American football player
 Kenny Green, basketball player
 Richard Henyard, convicted murderer
 David Hobby, photojournalist, founder of Strobist.com
 Solomon Jones, NBA professional basketball player
 Kathryn Joosten, actress 
 Hughie Lee-Smith, artist
 Jonathan Lucroy, professional baseball player
 Kristin Ludecke, beauty queen
 Thomas McClary (singer/songwriter), founding member of the Commodores
 Chris Okey, baseball player
 Michael Ray, country music singer
 Jon Schneck, guitarist in alternative rock band Relient K
 John Robert Schrieffer, physicist, winner of the Nobel Prize in Physics (1972) 
 Brady Singer, baseball player
 Patricia Sullivan, political activist
 David Walker, astronaut
 Gunner Wright, actor

References

External links
 City of Eustis official website

 
Cities in Lake County, Florida
Greater Orlando
Cities in Florida